El Ghazi may refer to:

Borj El Kebir, an ancient castle in Djerba, Tunisia

People with the surname
Anwar El Ghazi (born 1995), Dutch professional footballer
Ben Assou El Ghazi (born 1938), Moroccan long-distance runner
Hayat El Ghazi (born 1979), Moroccan hammer thrower
Hassan el Ghazi (1713–1790), Ottoman Grand Admiral